Taulaga is a deserted village on Swains Island, American Samoa (nearby Etena is also deserted).

It had the majority of the island's population of 17, a church, a communications center, and a school. It was hit heavily by Cyclone Percy in 2005. Taulaga is in the northwest of the atoll.

The 2020 census recorded no people living on Swains Island, suggesting the village has no residents.

References

Villages in American Samoa